Woodball is a sport where a mallet is used to pass a ball through gates. This game can be played in grass, sand or indoor. The sport is in the program of Asian Beach Games and was incorporated in 2008. The International Woodball Federation is based in Taipei, Taiwan.

History
The sport was invented in Taiwan by Weng Ming-hui and Kuang-chu Young in 1990. The Olympic Council of Asia made the sport a program of the Asian Beach Games in 2008.

Championships 
Ahris Sumariyanto attended the Asian Beach Games Danang 2016 with his Indonesian team-mates. He finished first and was awarded the gold medal. He only finished one hit ahead of Thailand's Jetsada Cheenkurd who finished with the sIlver medal in second. Kim Pyo Hwan from Korea was awarded the bronze medal and finished in third.

See also
Croquet
Sports in Taiwan
List of Taiwanese inventions and discoveries

References

External links
Official site of International Woodball Federation
Book or rules

Taiwanese inventions
Ball games
Sport in Taiwan
Games and sports introduced in 1990
Precision sports